MIDAC is an acroynm which may refer to:
 MIDAC (University of Michigan), Michigan Digital Automatic Computer, a pioneering digital computer at the University of Michigan
 MIDAC (CRC), Microprocessor Intelligent Data Acquisition and Control, a building automation system